Deportivo Independiente Caravel, known also as Independiente Caravel, or simply Caravel  is an Aruban football club based in Angochi, Santa Cruz, which currently plays in the Division di Honor. Caravel has twice finished in third place in the Aruban Division di Honor.
The traditional colors of the club are yellow and blue.

Carlo Luzi, a player from the Cook Islands, was the most symbolic player of the team and was also awarded as the best footballer in the history of the Aruba league.

Achievements

Aruban Division Uno: 4
2009-10, 2012-13, 2014-15, 2018-19

Players

Current squad
As of 10 September 2022

External links
Official facebook page   
Fan facebook page   
Division Honor
Fan website
Official website

References 

Football clubs in Aruba
1977 establishments in Aruba